The 26th European Women's Artistic Gymnastics Championships were held from 27 April to 30 April 2006 in Volos, Greece.

Led by new senior Vanessa Ferrari, Italy became the first team besides Romania, Russia, and the Soviet Union to win the senior team title. Ferrari went on to win the All-Around gold medal for Italy at that year's world championships. Katja Abel's bronze medal on vault was the first medal for unified Germany at the European Championships.

Timetable

Medalists

Seniors

Team

Vault

Uneven Bars

Balance Beam

Floor Exercise

Juniors

Individual all-around

Vault

Uneven Bars

Balance Beam

Floor Exercise

Medal Count

Combined

Seniors

Juniors

References 

 
 

2006
European Women's Artistic Gymnastics Championships
2006 in European sport
Sport in Volos
Events in Volos
International gymnastics competitions hosted by Greece
2006 in Greek sport